Panau stenoptera is a moth in the family Cossidae. It was described by Roepke in 1957. It is found in Vietnam and Malaysia and on Sumatra, Java and the Andaman Islands.

Subspecies
Panau stenoptera stenoptera
Panau stenoptera sumatrana (Roepke, 1957) (Sumatra, Vietnam)

References

Natural History Museum Lepidoptera generic names catalog

Zeuzerinae
Moths described in 1957